The Union Chapel, now known as St. Andrew's Episcopal Church, is a historic church located near Glenwood, Howard County, Maryland, United States. It is a rectangular two-story building of stuccoed stone construction painted pastel yellow completed in 1833 for $1,459. To the rear of the chapel is the attractively landscaped non-sectarian Oak Grove Cemetery. Charles Dorsey Warfield, a member of the prominent Warfield family that settled this region, deeded the property to the residents of the area for non-denominational church and community use. The building was constructed for $5,040 In 1886, it became part of the Methodist church circuit.

Union Chapel was listed on the National Register of Historic Places in 1975.

See also
List of Howard County properties in the Maryland Historical Trust
Bushy Park, Glenwood Maryland
Ellerslie (Glenwood, Maryland)

References

External links
, including photo from 1997, at Maryland Historical Trust
St. Andrew's Episcopal Church website

Churches on the National Register of Historic Places in Maryland
19th-century churches in the United States
Churches completed in 1833
Churches in Howard County, Maryland
Howard County, Maryland landmarks
National Register of Historic Places in Howard County, Maryland
19th-century Episcopal church buildings
Glenwood, Howard County, Maryland